This discography is an overview of the musical works of German indie rock band Madsen. The most successful release from Madsen is the top two album, Wo es beginnt.

Studio albums

Live albums

EPs
2011: Willkommen bei Madsen (5-Track-EP mit Coverversionen)

Singles

Other releases 
 2014: Hey Hey Wickie
 2015: Inkognito
 2017: Bumm! Bumm! Bumm! (feat. König Boris)

Other appearances 
 2014: K.B.A.G. (Jennifer Rostock feat. Feine Sahne Fischfilet, Großstadtgeflüster, MC Fitti & Madsen)

Video albums 
 2010: Labyrinth (Limited Deluxe Edition)
 2012: Wo es beginnt (Deluxe Edition)
 2014: 10 Jahre Madsen Live

Music videos

References

Madsen
Madsen